Bill Leen (born March 1, 1962) is an American musician from Tempe, Arizona. He is the bass player of the band Gin Blossoms, which he co-founded in 1987 with his longtime friend Doug Hopkins.

Leen graduated from McClintock High School in Tempe, then studied English and philosophy at Arizona State University, leaving during his junior year to devote his energy to music.

He and Doug Hopkins played in a variety of local Tempe bands during the early 1980s, including The Moral Majority and The Psalms before moving to Portland, Oregon and forming The 10 o'Clock Scholars. His first taste of musical notoriety occurred while playing with the Psalms. The Psalms were asked to fill in for up-and-coming band, R.E.M. which had cancelled a show, opening for Billy Idol at the Devil House nightclub.

References

1962 births
American rock bass guitarists
American male bass guitarists
Arizona State University alumni
Gin Blossoms members
Living people
Guitarists from Arizona
People from Tempe, Arizona
Alternative rock bass guitarists
American alternative rock musicians
American male guitarists
20th-century American guitarists